Coombeshead Academy, formerly Coombeshead College, is an 11–18 Comprehensive School with approximately 1000 students.

Bushell Theatre
In the 2011 Spring term Coombeshead Academy opened The Bushell to the community. The theatre is used for the school's expressive arts shows, music concerts, drama productions and some assemblies.

Education South West
Since January 2017, Coombeshead Academy has been a part of Education South West, a large multi-academy trust consisting of 10 successful schools in Devon in order to maintain standards of education.

External links
 Academy website
 Sixth Form website
 Ofsted
 Education South West

Academies in Devon
Secondary schools in Devon
Newton Abbot